Charles J. (Chuck) Moss (born 1953) was the Republican State Representative representing the 40th District, which covers the municipalities of Bloomfield Hills, Michigan, Keego Harbor, Michigan, Orchard Lake Village, Michigan, Franklin, Michigan, Bingham Farms, Michigan, Beverly Hills, Michigan and Sylvan Lake, Michigan.

Biography
Moss grew up in Midland, Michigan and graduated from Herbert Henry Dow High School in 1971. He received a B.A. from Michigan State University's James Madison College. He obtained a J.D. from the University of Detroit law school.

Moss is a practicing attorney, and also has an active involvement with Detroit local media. He has hosted a number of shows on WXST, WJIM and was the co-host of "Back to Back" on WTVS. He has also been a freelance writer for the Oakland Press Detroit News, and Computer Gaming World.

He resides in Birmingham with Alice Moss and his two daughters.

Political career

Moss served on the Birmingham Traffic and Safety Board from 1993-1997 before being elected to the City Commission. In 2000 he was elected mayor.

Later in 2000, Moss was elected to the Oakland County Commission. He served as the chair of the Finance Committee. He served on the Commission until 2006.

In November 2006, Moss was elected to the State House, defeating Democrat Syed Jafry.

In his time in the State House, Moss has attempted to pass legislation easing regulatory burdens by State government. He supported a bill that would Michigan's Department of Environmental Quality's enforcement actions.

He also has introduced legislation that would transfer the management of the Detroit water and sewer system to a regional authority governed by representatives from the City of Detroit, and St. Clair County, Lapeer County, Macomb County, Oakland County, Washtenaw County, Genesee County and Wayne County.

Election history

|- style="background-color:#E9E9E9"
! align=left valign=top | 2006 Candidate
! align=right | Party
! align=right | Popular votes
! align=right | Vote percentage
|-
|align=left valign=top|Chuck Moss
|valign="top"|Republican
|valign="top"|28,092
|valign="top"|65%
|-
|align=left valign=top|Syed Jafry
|valign="top"|Democrat
|valign="top"|14,880
|valign="top"|35%
|- style="background-color:#E9E9E9"
|}

References

External links
 Campaign Website

1953 births
Republican Party members of the Michigan House of Representatives
Living people
Michigan State University alumni
University of Detroit Mercy alumni
People from Midland, Michigan
People from Birmingham, Michigan